The Mighty Ducks: Game Changers is an American sports comedy-drama television series based on the 1992 film written by Steve Brill. Developed by Brill, Josh Goldsmith, and Cathy Yuspa for Disney+, the series serves as a follow-up to the film, and is produced by ABC Signature and Brillstein Entertainment, with Brill serving as head writer, and Goldsmith and Yuspa serving as showrunners.

Lauren Graham, Brady Noon, and Emilio Estevez star in the series. As of January 2018, ABC began developing a series based on the franchise The Mighty Ducks, with Brill set to write the series. The series was announced to be released on Disney+ in November 2018. Filming for the series was scheduled to begin in February 2020, and ended in June 2020. In August 2020, it was announced that filming could officially begin after Disney TV Studios made a deal with British Columbia unions about testing the cast and crew members for the ongoing COVID-19 pandemic. The series premiered on March 26, 2021. In August 2021, the series was renewed for a second season. which premiered on September 28, 2022. Unlike the film series, which was panned by critics, Game Changers received mostly positive reviews. In February 2023, the series was cancelled after two seasons.

Synopsis
Now a hockey powerhouse, the Mighty Ducks junior team is selective about who makes the roster. After being cut and told he is wasting his time, 12-year-old Evan Morrow, at the urging of his mother, forms a new team of underdogs with the help of original Ducks coach, Gordon Bombay, who has since become the despondent owner of a low level ice rink.

Cast and characters

Main

 Lauren Graham as Alex Morrow, mother of Evan and coach of the Don't Bothers. She formed the Don't Bothers after Evan is cut by the Mighty Ducks. Alex didn't know anything about hockey when she started coaching, but has since helped the team grow in confidence by putting fun first. Alex was briefly fired as coach after becoming too obsessed with winning, but later returned in time for States. She works as a paralegal for Ducksworth, Saver & Gross Law Firm.
 Brady Noon as Evan Morrow, Alex's son who is cut by the Ducks for being too slow and told he is wasting his time pursuing hockey. He is the Don't Bothers' captain until he steps aside to regain the trust of his team after almost leaving to rejoin the Ducks. Evan scores the first goal in team history against his old team.
 Maxwell Simkins as  Nick Ganz, Evan's best friend who helps start the Don't Bothers. He lives with his two moms next door to the Morrows. He is also friends with Winnie, the cocoa girl at the Ice Palace. Nick co-hosted The Wraparound podcast with Mary Joe prior to joining the team.
 Swayam Bhatia as Sofi Hanson-Bhatt, Evan's friend who is a talented hockey player with an accurate shot. She leaves the Ducks to join the Don't Bothers despite her perfectionist parents opposing the move.
 Julee Cerda as Stephanie (season 1), Alex's snobby boss at DS&G who frequently takes advantage of Alex's soft nature. Her softer side comes out when it is revealed she and husband, Clark, are getting divorced. Her twins, Trevor and Ruby, play for the Ducks.
 Luke Islam as Koob, the Don't Bothers' goalie with great reflexes. He was a hardcore gamer before joining the team.
 Bella Higginbotham as Lauren (season 1), a member of the Don't Bothers who is into cosplay. She is seen to be the team's enforcer, having learned a few moves from former Duck Connie Moreau.
 Taegen Burns as Maya, a member of the Don't Bothers from New York and part of the popular girls clique at school. She is Lauren's best friend.
 Kiefer O'Reilly as Logan (season 1), a member of the Don't Bothers who moved to Minnesota from Toronto after his parents divorced. He lives with his father in the same street as Evan and Nick. Despite having a lot of pro hockey equipment, Logan had trouble skating until Bombay helps him overcome this and discovers he has a talent for stick-handling. He is the last of the Don't Bothers to score a goal.
 De'Jon Watts as Sam, a member of the Don't Bothers who never turns down a dare, such as Evan daring him to join the team
 Emilio Estevez as Gordon Bombay (season 1), the original Ducks coach and owner of the Ice Palace. He was found to be in a dark place when the Don't Bothers start playing at the rink and reignites his love for the game. He later becomes assistant coach of the Don't Bothers and briefly coach when Alex is fired before being reinstated.
 Naveen Paddock as Jace Cole (season 2)
 Josh Duhamel as Colin Cole (season 2), a former NHL player who runs an intense hockey training camp called the Elite Performance Ice Center that the Ducks signed up for the summer and Jace's father

Recurring

 Dylan Playfair as Coach T, the condescending head coach of the Mighty Ducks who cuts Evan from the team, before trying, albeit unsuccessfully, to bring him back. He regularly taunts the Don't Bothers and refers to them as a "bunch of clowns".
 Em Haine as Winnie Berigan, an employee at the Ice Palace. She is friends with Nick and often seen talking to Alex. She is also known for having many boyfriends.
 Lia Frankland as Mary Joe, host of The Wraparound podcast and Nick's former co-host. Her father, Terry, takes over from Nick when he joins the Don't Bothers.
 Amy Goodmurphy as Paula Ganz, Nick's mother
 Jane Stanton as Sherri Andrews, Nick's other mom
 Stephnie Weir as Marni (season 2), Coach Cole's administrative assistant at the Elite Performance Ice Center
 Connor DeWolfe as A.J. Lawrence (season 2)
 Timm Sharp as Coach Toby (season 2)
 Tiffany Denise Hobbs as Coach Jackie (season 2)
 Rich Eisen as himself (season 2)
 Margot Anderson-Song as Gertie Willins (season 2)
 Noah Baird as Cody "Fries" Lawrence (season 2), A.J. younger brother who is under A.J.'s shadow
 Jaden Micah Wolfe as Franklin (season 2)
 Joelle Better as Rambo Tate (season 2)

Special guest stars
 Matt Doherty as Lester Averman
 Elden Henson as Fulton Reed
 Garette Henson as Guy Germaine
 Vincent A. LaRusso as Adam Banks
 Marguerite Moreau as Connie Moreau
 Justin Wong as Ken Wu

Episodes

Series overview

Season 1 (2021)

Season 2 (2022)

Production

Development
By 2018, Steve Brill and Jordan Kerner, who respectively served as writer and producer for the 1992 film The Mighty Ducks, pitched to ABC Signature head Tracy Underwood an idea for a TV series based on the film, which was approved for development.

On January 22, 2018, it was reported that a half-hour The Mighty Ducks TV series was being developed by ABC Signature Studios, with Brill set to write and executive-produce the series. The series was being shopped to several networks and streaming services by the studio. On November 8, 2018, it was reported that the series will be released on Disney's streaming service, Disney+. On November 6, 2019, it was reported that Josh Goldsmith, Cathy Yuspa, George Heller, and Brad Petrigala will co-executive-produce the series alongside Brill. On February 12, 2020, Goldsmith and Yuspa were revealed to be serving a co-creators and showrunners for the series, while Kerner and James Griffiths were revealed to be co-executive-producing the series, with star Lauren Graham also being credited as co-executive producer. On August 2, 2021, Disney+ renewed the series for a second season. On February 17, 2023, Disney+ cancelled the series after two seasons.

Casting
In February 2020, Lauren Graham and Brady Noon were cast in the series as the lead roles, with Emilio Estevez returning to reprise his role as Gordon Bombay, in addition to executive producing, as well as directing an episode. Swayam Bhatia, Taegen Burns, Julee Cerda, Bella Higginbotham, Luke Islam, Kiefer O'Reilly, Maxwell Simkins, De'Jon Watts were also cast in undisclosed roles. On March 18, 2021, it was reported that Elden Henson, Matt Doherty, Vincent LaRusso, Marguerite Moreau, Garette Henson, and Justin Wong would reprise their roles from The Mighty Ducks films for the sixth episode of the series. In November 2021, it was reported that Estevez's season 2 option would not be picked up due to creative differences and a contract dispute. On January 24, 2022, Josh Duhamel was cast in a starring role for the second season. On March 25, 2022, Naveen Paddock joined the cast as a new series regular while Margot Anderson-Song, Noah Baird, Stephnie Weir, Connor DeWolfe, Timm Sharp, and Tiffany Denise Hobbs joined the cast in recurring roles.

Filming
Filming for The Mighty Ducks was scheduled to begin on February 18, 2020, and end on June 11, 2020. Filming took place in Vancouver, British Columbia, Canada. James Griffiths served as a director for the series. In August 2020, it was announced that filming could officially begin after Disney TV Studios made a deal with British Columbia unions about testing the cast and crew members for the ongoing COVID-19 pandemic. Filming officially resumed in September 2020 and concluded on December 17, 2020. Filming for the second season is scheduled to begin in early 2022.

Promotion
In March 2021, ahead of the series premiere, and along with the NHL’s return to ESPN, Disney+ and ESPN collaborated on a 30 for 30 promotional featurette in partnership with Cheerios entitled The Legend of the Flying V on the championship game between the original Ducks and the Hawks, shown in the climactic scene of The Mighty Ducks. Among those who provide commentary are Don't Bothers members Sofi, Evan, Nick, Koob, Maya and Lauren along with original Ducks Fulton, Lester, and Connie – all played by their original actors ahead of their return in Game Changers – United States women's hockey forward and Olympic gold medalist Meghan Duggan, retired NHL forward and TNT hockey analyst Anson Carter and ESPN hockey analysts and SportsCenter anchors Linda Cohn, John Buccigross and Steve Levy.

Release
The Mighty Ducks: Game Changers was released on Disney+ on March 26, 2021. The second season was released on September 28, 2022.

The series made its linear premiere on Freeform on January 1, 2023.

Reception

Critical response 
On Rotten Tomatoes, the series holds an approval rating of 87% based on 39 critic reviews, with an average rating of 6.8/10. The website's critical consensus reads, "Game Changers doesn't quite flip the puck, but it has enough heart and good humor to make The Mighty Ducks proud." On Metacritic, it has a weighted average score of 72 out of 100 based on 16 critic reviews, indicating "generally favorable reviews."

Caroline Framke of Variety said Game Changers manages to be a solid follow-up, stating the series manages to provide a sharp update to a timeless story without relying too much on nostalgia, and praised the performance of the actors. Robert Daniels of Polygon applauded the humor of the series, claiming it offers a hysterical critique of present-day youth sports, and stated it manages to be a light-hearted family-friendly show. Joel Keller of Decider wrote that Lauren Graham represents the best asset of the show, praised the performances of the cast members, and complimented the writing, saying the dialogues are sharp and entertaining. Daniel Fienberg of The Hollywood Reporter praised the performances of the actors, complimented the series for its inclusive messaging, and found it sincere and emotional at times, despite calling the narrative flaccid. Ashley Moulton of Common Sense Media rated the series 3 out of 5 stars, complimented the depiction of positive messages, stating the show promotes perseverance and positivity, and found agreeable the presence of role models, citing the gender and racial diversity across the main cast.

Accolades

References

External links
 
 

2020s American comedy-drama television series
2021 American television series debuts
2022 American television series endings
American sports television series
American sequel television series
Disney+ original programming
Ice hockey television series
Live action television shows based on films
The Mighty Ducks
Television productions postponed due to the COVID-19 pandemic
Television shows filmed in Vancouver
Television series about teenagers
Television series based on Disney films
Television series by ABC Studios
Television shows set in Minnesota